The National Order of Benin is the highest national honour in the Republic of Benin. It is conferred on individuals that have achieved high merits in their field, and is awarded by the President of Benin. It is one of two post-colonial national medals of Benin, the other being the Medal of Honor of the Police. Recipients of this award include Aliko Dangote, President Dr. Ernest Bai Koroma, and Bunmi Makinwa.

Recipients
 Thomas Boni Yayi
 Maurice Couve de Murville
 Aliko Dangote
 Levi Eshkol
 Charles de Gaulle
 Ernest Bai Koroma
 Bunmi Makinwa
 Denis Sassou Nguesso
 Alassane Ouattara
 Zalman Shazar
 Michel Sidibé
 Al-Waleed bin Talal
 Mahmoud Ahmadinejad
 Luiz Inácio Lula da Silva
 Kim Il-sung

References

Orders, decorations, and medals of Benin
Awards established in 1960
1960 establishments in Africa